The 2014–15 Champions Hockey League was the first season of the Champions Hockey League, a European ice hockey tournament launched by 26 founding clubs, six leagues and the International Ice Hockey Federation (IIHF).

The regulation round began on 21 August 2014 and ended on 8 October 2014. The playoffs began on 4 November 2014 and ended with the Champions Hockey League Final on 3 February 2015. Luleå HF defeated Frölunda HC 4–2 to win the first edition of Champions Hockey League.

On 9 December 2013, the IIHF officially announced that they had launched the Champions Hockey League tournament, starting in the 2014–15 season. The season's format was revealed on 20 December 2013, during the playoffs of the 2013 European Trophy.

Team allocation 
A total of 44 teams from eleven different European first-tier leagues participated in the 2014–15 Champions Hockey League. The teams were decided with regards to different licenses for the founding teams, leagues and wildcards.

Team license 
The participating teams were decided with regards to different licenses for founding teams, league teams (from founding leagues) and other wildcard teams.

 A license: The 26 founding teams all got an A license, since they play in the first-tier league of their respective domestic league system in the 2014–15 season.
 B license: Two teams – the regular-season winner and the play-off champion in the 2013–14 season – from each of the founding leagues (the Austrian EBEL, the Czech Extraliga, the Finnish Liiga, the German DEL, the Swedish SHL and the Swiss NLA) received a B licence to the tournament. If those teams had already received an A license, other teams from the league took the B license spots. The order the B licenses were handed out is:
 National champion
 Regular season winner
 Runner-up, regular season
 Play-off finalist
 Best placed semifinal loser
 Worst placed semifinal loser

 C license: There were six wild cards, five for the champions of the Slovak Extraliga (Slovakia), GET-ligaen (Norway), Elite Ice Hockey League (United Kingdom), Ligue Magnus (France) and Metal Ligaen (Denmark), as well as one for the regular season winner of GET-ligaen. The Elite Ice Hockey League champion Belfast Giants were forced to turn down the chance due to lack of arena availability, giving place for the Challenge Cup winner Nottingham Panthers.

Teams 
A full list of the teams participating in the inaugural season and how they qualified was presented on 10 May 2014.

Round and draw dates
The schedule of the competition is as follows.

Group stage 

The group stage draw took place on 21 May 2014 in Minsk, Belarus, and the teams were assigned to eleven groups from A to K. The 44 teams were allocated into four pots based on their positions in their national leagues 2014, with the top seeded teams being placed in Pot 1 and the lower ranked teams in Pot 2, Pot 3 and the lowest ranked teams in Pot 4. They were drawn into eleven groups of four, with the restriction that teams from the same association could not be drawn against each other.

In each group, teams played against each other home-and-away in a round-robin format, giving six games per team. In total, 132 games were played in the group stage.

The schedule was released on 2 June 2014, with 30 of 44 teams playing their first game 21 August 2014, and the other teams playing their first game the following day. The match days were 21–22 August, 23–24 August, 4–5 September, 6–7 September, 23–24 September and 7–8 October 2014. All game times are local times.

The 11 group winners and the five best ranked runners-up qualified for the playoffs. The five best runners-up were determined by ranking all runners-up based on their number of points and goal differential in their respective groups, explained more detailed in the detailed group stage article.

See the detailed group stage page for tiebreakers if two or more teams are equal on points.

Group A

Group B

Group C

Group D

Group E

Group F

Group G

Group H

Group I

Group J

Group K

Ranking of second-placed teams

For tiebreakers if two or more teams are equal on points, see the detailed group stage page.

Playoffs 

In the playoffs, the teams played against each other over two legs on a home-and-away basis with the team with the better standing after the group stage having the second game at home, except for the one-match final played at the venue of the team with the best competition track record leading up to the final.

The mechanism of the draw for playoffs are as follows:
The entire playoff was drawn at a single occasion on 10 October 2014 to determine the eight pairings for the round of 16. After the draw, all matches up to the final are set in brackets.
In the draw for the round of 16, the eight best group winners were seeded, and the three group winners with worst record and the five best runners-up were unseeded. The seeded teams were drawn against the unseeded teams, with the seeded teams hosting the second leg. Teams from the same group could not be drawn against each other.

Bracket 

Note:
The teams listed on top of each tie play first match at home and the bottom team plays second match at home.

Round of 16 
The draw for the entire playoff (round of 16, quarter-finals, semi-finals and final) was held on 10 October 2014. The first legs were played on 4 November, and the second legs were played on 11 November 2014.

|}

Notes

Quarter-finals 
The first legs were played on 2 December, and the second legs were played on 9 December 2014.

|}

Semi-finals 
The first legs were played on 13 January, and the second legs were played on 20 January 2015.

|}

Final 

The final was played on 3 February 2015 at the venue of the team with the best competition track record leading up to the final.

Statistics

Leading scorers
Rankings based upon points, and sorted by goals.

Leading goaltenders
Goalkeepers with 40% or more of their team's total minutes, ranked by save percentage.

Prize money 
The 44 teams competed for a grand total of 1.5 million euros. However, the money distribution was not announced.

References 

 
1
Champions Hockey League seasons